Thomas Campbell Darst (November 10, 1875 – September 1, 1948) was the third Bishop of the Episcopal Diocese of East Carolina from 1915 to 1945.

Early life and education
Darst was born on November 10, 1875, in Pulaski, Virginia, the son of Major Thomas Welch Darst and Margaret Rebecca Glendy. He was raised as a Presbyterian. He was educated in public schools in Pulaski and later in Salem. He graduated from Roanoke College in 1899. He then also joined the Episcopal Church. He also enrolled at the Virginia Theological Seminary where he trained for the priesthood and graduated in 1902. On November 5, 1902, he married Florence Newton Wise. After her death in 1914, he married Fannie Lauriston Hardin on April 26, 1916. He had sons from the first marriage and a daughter from the second. He was awarded a Doctor of Divinity from the Virginia Seminary in 1914, University of the South in 1915, University of North Carolina in 1927 and Duke University in 1934.

Ordained Ministry
Darst was ordained deacon in June 1902 by Bishop George William Peterkin of West Virginia and priest in June 1903 by William Loyall Gravatt, Coadjutor Bishop of Virginia. Between 1902 and 1903, he served as assistant at Christ Church in Fairmont, West Virginia, while between 1903 and 1905 he was rector of Trinity Church in Upperville, Virginia, Emmanuel Church in Middleburg, Virginia and Redeemer Church in Aldie, Virginia. In 1905 he became rector of St Mark's Church in Richmond, Virginia, while in 1909 he transferred to Newport News, Virginia to become rector of St Paul's Church. Between 1914 and 1915 he served as rector of St James' Church in Richmond, Virginia.

Bishop
Darst was elected Bishop of East Carolina on October 7, 1914, and consecrated on January 6, 1915, in St James' Church, Wilmington, North Carolina by Presiding Bishop Daniel S. Tuttle. He retired on May 1, 1945, and was succeeded by Tom Wright (Bishop of East Carolina). He died on September 1, 1948, at the James Walker Memorial Hospital in Wilmington, North Carolina after suffering a heart attack. His funeral was held at St James' Wilmington and buried at the Oakdale Cemetery.

References

1875 births
1948 deaths
20th-century Anglican bishops in the United States
Burials at Oakdale Cemetery
People from Pulaski, Virginia
Converts to Anglicanism from Presbyterianism
Roanoke College alumni
Virginia Theological Seminary alumni
Episcopal bishops of East Carolina